British Steel (Port Talbot) Golf Club (Welsh: Clwb Golff Port Talbot) is a golf club with a 9-hole course based just outside Port Talbot at Neath Port Talbot, Wales. The members course is only available on pre-booked tee times.

In 2011 Neath Port Talbot County Council decided to build a dual-carriageway through the middle of the course.

References

Port Talbot
Golf clubs and courses in Wales
Golf club